Monte Santo de Minas is a Brazilian municipality in the south of the state of Minas Gerais. Its population is 21,513 inhabitants, according to the 2020 estimate. Its area is 594.6 km² and its density is 35.8 inhabitants per square kilometer.

Since around 2005 there have been a Diaspora from Monte Santo to Campinas (see Brazilian Silicon Valley), composed mostly of young men looking for better opportunities as qualified IT technicians. The Diaspora was initially led by Matheus Coradini and Cicero Alcantara.

Notable people
 

Néria Lúcio Buzatto (born 1980), lawyer and politician

References

Municipalities in Minas Gerais